The EF 16–35 mm lens is a family of professional wide-angle lenses made by Canon Inc. The original version, the EF 16-35mm f/2.8L USM, replaced the EF 17-35mm f/2.8L USM lens, which had itself replaced the EF 20-35mm f/2.8L lens.

The lens has an EF mount to work with the EOS line of cameras.

The EF 16-35mm f/2.8L USM was replaced by the EF 16-35mm f/2.8L II USM early in 2007. The main change saw the lens adopt a new optical design featuring 16 elements in 12 groups. Other changes include a 35 g increase in weight, a larger 82 mm filter diameter and a longer length.

The model II lens has garnered favorable to excellent reviews, and has been used in independent feature films like Marianne which was shot using a Canon EOS 7D.

The next member of the family, the EF 16-35mm f/4L IS USM, was announced in May 2014. While it is one stop slower than the other 16–35 mm versions, it is the first L-series wide-angle zoom to offer image stabilization.

Canon announced an upgraded EF 16-35mm f/2.8L III USM in August 2016, with retail availability expected in October of that year. Canon claims that the Mk III version is more durable than the Mk II version, and according to Digital Photography Review, "the Mark III clearly addresses one of its predecessor's largest shortcomings — poor off-center performance".

Specifications

Similar lenses
EF mount lenses
 EF 11–24 mm f/4L USM – an ultra wide angle lens that provides a wider field of view than the 16-35 mm lenses
 EF 17-35mm f/2.8L USM – replaced the EF 20-35mm lens f/2.8L and was replaced by the EF 16-35mm f/2.8L USM
 EF 17–40mm f/4L – classified as an L-series lens, but is less expensive than any version of the 16–35
 EF 20-35mm f/2.8L – Canon's first wide angle zoom lens, preceded the  EF 16-35mm f/2.8L USM
 EF 20-35mm f/3.5-4.5 USM – a consumer-level lens: significantly lower quality and less expensive than the L-series lenses
EF-S mount lenses
 EF-S 10-18mm f/4.5-5.6 IS STM – A consumer-level lens that features image stabilization and stepping motor technology. The 10–18 is less than half the price of the 10–22, and a fourth of the price of the 16–35 mm 4 IS.
 EF-S 10-22mm f/3.5–4.5 USM – An upper consumer-level lens, more expensive than the EF-S 10-18mm f/4.5-5.6 IS STM

References

External links

Canon EF 16–35mm 2.8L USM

Canon EF lenses